"Illella" (Korean: 일낼라; lit. "get up") is a song by South Korean girl group Mamamoo. It was released through RBW and Kakao Entertainment on October 11, 2022 as the lead single from their twelfth extended play Mic On. It was co-written by Moonbyul, Yoo Joo-yi, Kang Ji-won, Kim Do-hoon, and Inner Child, the latter three of whom also handled the song's production. Described as a K-pop and reggaeton track, it was met with positive reviews from critics who praised the group for their vocal harmonies.

Background and release
On June 20, 2022, Mamamoo's label RBW confirmed that the group was scheduled to have a comeback with a group album in the latter half of the year with a concert to follow. That August, Mamamoo members Solar and Moonbyul formed the group's first sub-unit, Mamamoo+. Their first single, "Better" featuring Big Naughty, was released on August 28. On September 27, the group officially announced their comeback with their 12th mini-album Mic On, scheduled for release on October 11. The first teaser video for the song was released on YouTube on October 5. "Illella" was released at 6PM KST on October 11, 2022.

Track listing
Digital download and streaming

 "Illella" (일낼라) – 2:46

Critical reception 
Divyansha Dongre of Rolling Stone India described it as a reggaeton track that beautifully fuses rich brass sounds with guitar riffs. They further commented "It’s a near-perfect soundscape to underline Mamamoo’s vocal prowess that has helped cement their identity as one of K-pop’s leading girl groups". Writing for Billboard, Jeff Benjamin said “Illella” is a full-fledged reminder of their commanding vocal deliveries and artistic auras, that serves powerful belts and sleek harmonies". For NME, Gladys Yeo described it as a reggae-inspired track, that sees the girl group dress in festival-inspired outfits". Pinkvilla described it "as an exotic song with a reggae tone that is impressive with thick brass and repetitive guitar riffs".

Commercial performance 
For the 42nd week of 2022, "Illella" debuted and peaked at number 66 on the Circle Digital Chart, placing at number nine on the component Circle Download Chart. In the United States, "Illella" debuted at number five on the Billboard World Digital Song Sales chart for the issue dated October 22, 2022.

Credits and personnel
Adapted from the group's official Twitter.
 Mamamoo – lead vocals
 Moonbyul – songwriting, composition
 Kim Do-hoon (RBW) – songwriting, composition
 Kang Ji-won – songwriting, composition, arrangement
 Yoo Joo-yi – songwriting
 Inner Child (MonoTree) – songwriting, composition

Charts

Weekly charts

Monthly charts

Release history

References

Mamamoo songs
2022 songs
2022 singles
Korean-language songs